Igor Kushpelev (born 10 August 1959) is a Georgian former swimmer. He competed in the men's 1500 metre freestyle at the 1976 Summer Olympics for the Soviet Union.

References

1959 births
Living people
Male swimmers from Georgia (country)
Soviet male swimmers
Olympic swimmers of the Soviet Union
Swimmers at the 1976 Summer Olympics
Sportspeople from Tbilisi
Universiade medalists in swimming
Universiade silver medalists for the Soviet Union
Medalists at the 1977 Summer Universiade
Medalists at the 1979 Summer Universiade